The 1974–75 Ohio Bobcats men's basketball team represented Ohio University as a member of the Mid-American Conference in the college basketball season of 1974–75. The team was coached by Dale Bandy in his first at Ohio.  Bandy was promoted from assistant when long time coach Jim Snyder retired.  They played their home games at Convocation Center. The Bobcats finished with a record of 12–14 and seventh in the MAC regular season with a conference record of 4–10.

Schedule

|-
!colspan=9 style=| Regular Season

Source:

Statistics

Team Statistics
Final 1974–75 Statistics

Source

Player statistics

Source

References

Ohio Bobcats men's basketball seasons
Ohio
Ohio Bobcats men's basketball
Ohio Bobcats men's basketball